Kandawala (also known as  Kandawala - Negombo and Kandawala - Katana)  is a suburb of the city of Negombo, Sri Lanka.

Administration
Kandawala consists of three Grama Niladhari divisions: Ihala Kandawala,  Pahala Kandawala and K. C. De Silva Pura, while the Kandawala Electoral Ward (subdivided into consisting Ilhala Kandawala and Pahala Kandawala) comes under the purview of the Katana Pradesiya Sabha.

Poththode, Anandapura and Batapaththala are other areas that lie within Kandawala.

In the Local Government Elections held in 2018, United National Party candidate Lasantha Deepal was elected to the Kandawala Ward, defeating  Sri Lanka Podujana Peramuna candidate Daisy Hapuarachchi.

Historical tower
The tower was later used by the Department of Survey; it collapsed on 27 November 2015, with the remains visible today.

Demographics

Roman Catholicism
Kandawala Parish is one of the largest parishes in the Roman Catholic Archdiocese of Colombo, and is home to the Our Lady of Sorrows Church, Demanhandiya church and Batapaththala church. A monastery of the Dominican Order and a community of Sisters of the Holy Family also exist in the area. Kandawala has a history of hosting Passion Plays, Yagaya being the best known.

Buddhism
Poththode Ananda Wivekashrama and Pahala Kandawala Sri Sambudaramaya temples are Buddhist religious places in the area.

Education
St. Joseph’s Junior School, Kandawala  provides education for students from grades 1 to 11.

Transportation
Kandawala is Located on the Negombo - Katana 251 bus route. Private buses are frequent, and several SLTB services are also available. A bus travelling from Nikaveratiya to Colombo via Pannala, Katana, Kandawala and Negombo also exists.

Notable people
 
  Sunil Costa (Director, Script Writer, Actor)

References

Populated places in Western Province, Sri Lanka